In Search of Adventure is an abridged compilation adventure module published by TSR, Inc. in 1987, for the Basic Set of the Dungeons & Dragons (D&D) fantasy role-playing game. Its product designation was TSR 9190. This 160-page book features cover artwork by Keith Parkinson.

Contents and plot summary
In Search of Adventure is a collection of parts of the first nine B-series D&D Basic Set modules, with a frame provided to fit the adventures into the Grand Duchy of Karameikos, the first country treated in the D&D Gazetteer game supplement series. The modules B1–B9 include: B1 In Search of the Unknown, B2 The Keep on the Borderlands, B3 Palace of the Silver Princess, B4 The Lost City, B5 Horror on the Hill, B6 The Veiled Society, B7 Rahasia, B8 Journey to the Rock, and B9 Castle Caldwell and Beyond.

The adventures in In Search of Adventure can be strung together in one of three new overarching plots using an adventure flow chart, depending on where the players head off from their starting point in the town of Threshold.

While most of the adventures in this compilation are complete, many of them were modified into a continuous campaign set in the Grand Duchy of Karameikos on the world of Mystara. Other major modifications include:

Publication history
In Search of Adventure was edited by Jeff Grubb and Jon Pickens, and was published by TSR in 1987 as a 160-page book. The module's cover art is by Keith Parkinson. The module compilation includes design work from Mike Carr, Gary Gygax, Tom Moldvay, Douglas Niles, David Cook, Tracy Hickman, Laura Hickman, Michael Malone, and Harry W. Nuckols.

Reception
Ken Rolston briefly reviewed B1–9 In Search of Adventure for Dragon magazine No. 128, commenting that it collects the "choice bits" from the previous modules. He noted the "good, old-fashioned dungeons by world-class designers like Gary Gygax, Doug Niles, and Tom Moldvay". Rolston also described two of the compilation's "exceptionally fine adventures": Rahasia, which he called "a classic low-level FRPG scenario by Tracy Hickman of Dragonlance saga and Ravenloft fame", and David "Zeb" Cook's The Veiled Society, which he called "a rare example of a political and diplomatic adventure in an urban setting for low-level D&D game characters". Rolston concluded the review by saying, "Aside from the intrinsic value of these adventures, they are perfect for introducing new players to FRPGs through the simple, well-presented D&D Basic game system."

Lawrence Schick, in his 1991 book Heroic Worlds, stated that In Search of Adventure compiles the best parts of the B-series of modules, and is "Quite a good deal".

See also
 List of Dungeons & Dragons modules

References

External links
http://www.rpg.net/news+reviews/reviews/rev_4127.html

Dungeons & Dragons modules
Mystara
Role-playing game supplements introduced in 1987